The 1973 Greenlandic Football Championship was the 3rd edition of the Greenlandic Football Championship. With the final round being held in Nuuk. Which was won by Grønlands Seminarius Sportklub, the third national title in its history.

Final round

See also
Football in Greenland
Football Association of Greenland
Greenland national football team
Greenlandic Football Championship

References

Greenlandic Men's Football Championship seasons
Green
Green
Foot